Kathimerini (Greek: Η Καθημερινή, pronounced [i kaθimeriˈni], meaning The Daily) is a daily, political and financial morning newspaper published in Athens. Its first edition was printed on September 15, 1919. and it is considered the leading newspaper in Greece, with both the highest circulation and a strong digital presence. 

It is published in Greek and there is also an English edition, both print and digital. Kathimerini English Edition is published in Greece and Cyprus along with the New York Times International. Kathimerini also produces a wide range of leading magazines, including Vogue Greece with Conde Nast International, as well as publications for The Walt Disney Company Greece.

Considered Greece's paper of record, Kathimerini traditionally identifies with a broad range of the political spectrum, from the liberal center to the moderate right, while covering the positions and hosting analyses from all the main political parties and opinions from columnists with different points of view.

History
Kathimerini was founded by Georgios Vlachos, a prominent antivenizelist, in 1919 and was later inherited by his daughter Helen Vlachos (Eléni Vláchou) and her husband, retired submarine commander Constantine Loundras. Considered a high-quality broadsheet, Kathimerini is traditionally perceived as one of the main conservative voices of Greek media. The newspaper was highly critical of Eleftherios Venizelos in the early 20th century, and also opposed Georgios Papandreou in the postwar years.

It maintains a traditional layout, with its original griffin logo, and incorporates illustrated glossy inserts in its Sunday edition. Vlachou sold the company shortly before her death to George Koskotas and it passed in October 1995 to Aristeidis Alafouzos, a real estate developer and shipping magnate who died in 2017; he was succeeded by his son Themistoklis Alafouzos.

Circulation
Kathimerinis daily edition circulation figures are not available since the newspaper has prohibited press agencies from releasing such data. Its Sunday edition had a circulation of 95,007 in January 2014.

Editing staff 
 Managing editor: Alexis Papahelas

Company
Kathimerini is published by Kathimerini Publishing SA. This company was previously listed on the Athens Stock Exchange but it was delisted on December 2015.

References

External links

 
Kathimerini English Edition Website

Publications established in 1919
1919 establishments in Greece
Greek-language newspapers
Newspapers published in Athens
Daily newspapers published in Greece
Companies formerly listed on the Athens Exchange
Conservative media
Conservatism in Greece
English-language mass media in Greece